Elections to Sheffield City Council were held on 3 May 1979. One third of the council was up for election.

Election result

This result has the following consequences for the total number of seats on the Council after the elections:

Ward results

Don Sparkes was previously elected as a Liberal councillor

Harry Hanwell was a sitting councillor for Owlerton ward

References

1979 English local elections
1979
1970s in Sheffield